Pseudochorthippus curtipennis, known generally as marsh meadow grasshopper, is a species of slant-faced grasshopper in the family Acrididae. Other common names include the meadow grasshopper and short-winged brown grasshopper. It is found in North America.

Subspecies
These two subspecies belong to the species Pseudochorthippus curtipennis:
 Pseudochorthippus curtipennis californicus Vickery, 1967
 Pseudochorthippus curtipennis curtipennis (Harris, 1835)

References

Further reading

Gomphocerinae
Articles created by Qbugbot
Insects described in 1835